Prefeito Octávio de Almeida Neves Airport  is the airport serving São João del-Rei, Brazil. The airport is named after a former Mayor of São João del-Rei.

It is operated by Socicam.

History
On March 7, 2012, because of safety concerns, the National Civil Aviation Agency of Brazil (ANAC) imposed operational restrictions related to scheduled flights on the airport until irregularities are solved. General aviation operations were not affected.

Airlines and destinations
No scheduled flights operate at this airport.

Access

See also

List of airports in Brazil

References

External links

Airports in Minas Gerais